Sami Bouajila (born 26 May 1966) is a French actor who has won two César Awards. Bouajila has worked and acted in two Oscar nominated films (Days of Glory and Outside the Law), both directed by director Rachid Bouchareb.

Early life
Bouajila's father emigrated from Tunisia to France in 1956, and worked as a building painter, a professionally recognized skill requiring specific technical knowledge. His grandfather was a Berber born in Tripoli, Libya and immigrated to Tunisia. Sami was born and grew up in Échirolles, a suburb south of Grenoble. He studied theatre.

Filmography

Film

Television

Theatre

Awards and nominations

References

External links

Living people
1966 births
20th-century French male actors
21st-century French male actors
Best Supporting Actor César Award winners
Cannes Film Festival Award for Best Actor winners
French male film actors
French male stage actors
French male television actors
French people of Arab descent
French people of Berber descent
French people of Libyan descent
French people of Tunisian descent
Male actors from Grenoble
People from Échirolles
People from La Tronche